Kazuya Nakayama (中山一也) is a Japanese actor and producer known for films such as Izo and Agitator directed by Takashi Miike.

Filmography
 Keiji monogatari 2 - Ringo no uta (1983)
 Renzoku satsujinki: Reiketsu (1984)
 Agitator (2001)
 Izo (2004)
 Waru: kanketsu-hen (2006)
 Jitsuroku Shinsengumi: kanketsu-hen (2006)
 Jitsuroku Shinsengumi (2006)
 Waru (2006)
 Detective Story (2007)
 Johnen: Love of Sada (2008)

References

External links 

Living people
Japanese male actors
Year of birth missing (living people)